WEWN is the shortwave radio outlet of the EWTN, a large Roman Catholic international broadcaster based in Irondale, Alabama. It was launched by Mother Angelica on December 28, 1992. WEWN broadcasts from the city of Vandiver, Alabama, in the vicinity of the Birmingham metro area. There are four transmitters capable of 500 kilowatts each, but are run no higher than 250 kW.

On March 30, 2008, EWTN ceased all shortwave transmissions to North America and expanded its English language coverage of WEWN to India, the Middle East and Southeast Asia. Spanish Language coverage was also expanded to Cuba, South America, Mexico and the Caribbean. Previously WEWN only broadcast to North America, Latin America, Africa and Europe.

The station currently transmits English programming to Africa, Southeast Asia, the Middle East, India on SW, and Spanish programming to South America, the Caribbean, Mexico and Central America, via satellite Galaxy 15 at 133°W. Programming is similar to that of the network's television channel.

On August 31, 2021 EWTN announces that nine million more listeners in the Chicago market and beyond will have the ability to tune into EWTN Radio’s programs, through an affiliation with WNDZ. EWTN Radio programming is also available on The Station of the Cross network of AM and FM stations in upstate New York.

Frequencies and affiliates 
See also Shortwave radio frequencies and AM/FM affiliate map.
The station WEWN 1 transmits English programming to S.E. Asia/Middle East/Africa/India for A21 period (March 28 - October 31, 2021) on
9.385 MHz from 0000-0900 UTC.

References

External links 
 EWTN Radio

Shortwave radio stations in the United States
EWN
Catholic radio stations
Radio stations established in 1992
1992 establishments in Alabama